Kathleen McCarty (born December 2, 1949) is an American politician who has served in the Connecticut House of Representatives from the 38th district since 2015.

References

1949 births
Living people
Republican Party members of the Connecticut House of Representatives
21st-century American politicians